was a Japanese manga artist. Known as the Master of Gag Manga, he created many popular manga such as Osomatsu-kun, Himitsu no Akko-chan, and Tensai Bakabon.

Biography 
He was born in Rehe, Manchuria, the son of a Japanese military police officer. After World War II, he grew up in Niigata Prefecture and Nara Prefecture. When he was 19, he moved to Tokyo.

While working at a chemical factory, he drew many manga. After that, Tokiwa-so accepted him. He started his career as a shōjo artist, but in 1958, his Nama-chan (ナマちゃん) became a hit, so he became a specialist in comic manga. He won the Shogakukan Manga Award in 1964 for Osomatsu-kun and the Bungeishunjū Manga Award in 1971 for Tensai Bakabon. He is said to have been influenced by Buster Keaton and MAD magazine.

In 1965, Akatsuka established his own company "Fujio Productions Ltd.".

In 2000, he drew manga in braille for the blind.

Many of his manga featured supporting characters who ended up becoming more popular and more associated with their series than the main character, such as Papa (Tensai Bakabon), Iyami, Chibita (Osomatsu-kun), and Nyarome (Mōretsu Atarō).

In April 2002 he was hospitalized for intra-axial hematoma and was said to frequently be in a persistent vegetative state from 2004 until his death. In July 2006, his second wife Machiko, who had been nursing him, suddenly died from a subarachnoid hemorrhage. On August 2, 2008, he died of pneumonia at a hospital in Bunkyō, Tokyo.

Works
Among Akatsuka's extensive body of work, his series of Osomatsu-kun, Himitsu no Akko-chan, Tensai Bakabon, and Mōretsu Atarō are often considered his top four major series by Fujio Pro, due to their success in garnering animated adaptations and their lengthy runs and revivals.

Serial Works
(In order of publication)

1950s
  (October 1958-March 1959, Shojo Club)- Assisted Shotaro Ishinomori and Hideko Mizuno, published under the shared pseudonym U.MIA
  (October 1958-April 1961, Hitomi)
July–December 1961, Ribon
  (December 1958-March 1961, Manga King)
1960s
  (January 1960-March 1962, Shojo Club) 
  (March 1960-June 1961, Ribon)
  (April to September 1960, Fun 4th Grader)
  (April 1960-March 1961, Fun 5th Grader)
  (May–September 1961, Adventure King)
January 1964-April 1965, Shonen Book
  (April 15, 1962- May 18, 1969, Weekly Shonen Sunday)- Serialization changed to monthly from August 13, 1967 to allow for less frequent but longer chapters
April 1964-March 1969, Separate Edition Shonen Sunday
April to December 1966, Boys' Life 
April to October 1966, Elementary School 4th Grade 
April to December 1966, Elementary School 2nd Grade 
April 1966-March 1967, Kindergarten
May 1966-March 1967, Elementary School 1st Grade
July 1966-March 1967, Monthly Shogakukan Book 
March 19, 1972 – December 24, 1973, Weekly Shonen King
November 1987-March 1990, Comic BomBom 
February 1988-January 1990, TV Magazine
  (April 1962-March 1963, Fun 5th Grader)
  (April 1962-March 1963, Junior High 1st Year Course)
  (June 1962-September 1965, Ribon)
November 1968-December 1969, Ribon
October 1988-September 1989, Nakayoshi
  (April 1963-March 1964, Elementary School 4th Grade)
  (August–December 1963, Adventure King)
  (August–September 1963, Bokura)
  (October 1963-September 1965, Shonen)
  (January 1964-December 1965, Adventure King)
January–September 1967, Adventure King
  (April 1964-March 1965, Elementary School 4th Grade)
  (1964, Margaret)
  (June 22, 1965- July 5, 1966, Shojo Friend)
  (July 1965-August 1966, Heibon)
  (August 1-August 29, 1965, Weekly Shonen Magazine)
  (October 1965-August 1966, Ribon)
  (January–March 1966, Boys' Life)
  (April–September 1966, Shonen Book)
  (January–May 1967, Shonen Book)
  (January–July 1967, Ribon)
  (June 1967-January 1969, Shonen Book)
  (January–September 1967, Elementary School 2nd Grade)
  (April 9, 1967 – February 23, 1969, Weekly Shonen Magazine)
August 1967-January 1969, Separate Edition Shonen Magazine
August 24, 1969 – April 5, 1970, Weekly Shonen Sunday
September 9, 1969-June 1970, Deluxe Shonen Sunday 
May 10, 1971 – June 1, 1971, Weekly Bokura Magazine
June 27, 1971 – December 7, 1976, Weekly Shonen Magazine
August 1974-May 1975, Separate Edition Shonen Magazine 
June 1976-December 1978, Monthly Shonen Magazine
October 1987-October 1991, Comic BomBom
November 1987-January 1991, TV Magazine
January 1988-February 1989, Monthly Shonen Magazine
October 1989-January 1991, Monthly Hero Magazine
November 1991-December 1992, Deluxe BomBom
  (September 1967-August 1969, Ribon)
  (September 1967-December 1969, Elementary School 1st Grade)
  (1967-1968, Shojo Friend)
  (November 28, 1967 – June 28, 1970, Weekly Shonen Sunday)
April 1969-October 1971, Kindergarten
October 1969-March 1971, Elementary School 4th Grade
January 1970-June 1971, Elementary School 3rd Grade
January 1970-November 1971, Elementary School 2nd Grade
April 1990-January 1991, Comic BomBom
May 1990-January 1991, TV Magazine
  (1968, Weekly Shonen King)
  (1968, Weekly Shonen King)
  (May–September 1969, Deluxe Shonen Sunday)
 
  (1969, Shonen Jump)
  (1969, Weekly Shonen Jump)
1970s
  (1970, Weekly Shonen Jump)
  (1970-1971, Weekly Shonen King)
  (August 2, 1970 – March 14, 1971, Weekly Shonen Sunday)
  (1970-1971, Bokura)
  (1970-1971, Shonen Picture Report)
  (January–September 1971, Separate Edition Shonen Magazine)
  (January–December 1971, Red Flag Sunday)
  (April 1971-March 1972, 4th Grade)
  (September 5, 1971 – July 14, 1974, Weekly Shonen Sunday)
  (January 9-December 24, 1972, Red Flag Sunday)
  (November 1971-August 1972, Kindergatden) 
  (April 1972-March 1973, Shogakukan's Elementary School 4th Grade) 
  (June 1972-December 1974, Adventure King) 
  (October 1972-December 1982, Weekly Bunshun)
  (November 1972-April 1973, Manga NO.1)
  (1974, Weekly Shonen King #5-38)
  (April–June 1974, High School 2nd Year Course)
  (1974-1975, Weekly Shonen Sunday)
  (1974-1976, Weekly Shonen King)
  (1974-1975, Weekly Shonen Champion)
  (January 1975-April 1976, Princess)
  (January 1975-October 1976, Adventure King)
  (1975, Weekly Shonen Magazine)
  (1975-1976, Weekly Shonen Sunday)
  (March 9-December 7, 1975, Yomiuri Shimbun Sunday)
  (May 1976-May 1977, Princess) 
  (1976-1977, Weekly Shonen Sunday)
  (1976-1977, Weekly Shonen King)
  (1977, Manga-kun)
  (1977, Weekly Shonen Magazine)
  (April 1977-May 1978, Dokkan V)
  (1977, Weekly Shonen Sunday)
  (1978, Weekly Shonen King)
  (April 1979-March 1982, Elementary School 1st Grade)
  (July 27-August 17, 1978, Weekly Manga Action)
  (August 1978-January 1979, Dokkan V)
  (September 1, 1978 – September 1, 1979, New Art Newspaper)
  (November 30, 1978 – March 23, 1979, Weekly Manga Action)
  (February–December 1979, Shonen Challenge)
  (April 1979-March 1981, Elementary School 5th Grade)
1980s
  (January–June 1980, Shonen Challenge)
  (February 1980-March 1981, Monthly CoroCoro Comic)
  (April 1980-February 1981, Popcorn)- Magazine was published bimonthly until its closure in February 1981
  (April 6, 1980 – March 15, 1981, Shonen and Shojo Newspaper)
  (September–November 1980, Shonen Challenge)
  (1981, Weekly Shonen Jump)
  (April 1981- March 1982, Monthly CoroCoro Comic)
  ( April 1981-March 1983, 5th Grade)
  (May–December 1981, Just Comic) 
  (April 1982-December 1984, Novel Shincho)
  (April 4-October 3, 1983, Heibon Punch)
  (November 1983-November 1985, 2001 magazine)
  (1983-1984, Weekly Shonen Champion)
  (1985, Weekly Shonen Champion)
  (February 17-December 29, 1985, Sunday Daily)
  (1986-1989, Big Comic Original)
  (May 6-December 29, 1987, Weekly Masses)
  (October 1987, June 1988, August 1988)
1990s
  (October 1990-August 1991, Comic BomBom)
  (September 1991-June 1992, Comic BomBom)
  (March 1993-March 1994, Deluxe BomBom)
  (January–April 1995, Manga Da No 1)
  (January–February 1999, Big Comic)

Short Stories
  (June 7, 1956, Akebono Publishing)- Mainstream debut work, written directly for a tankobon release
  (August 25, 1956, Akebono Publishing)
  (December 10, 1956, Akebono Publishing)
  (January 1966, Shonen Book)
  (1966, Ribbon)
  (July 10, 1970, Big Comic)
  (December 1970, Separate Edition Shonen Sunday)
  (1971, Weekly Shonen Sunday)
  (January 1, 1973, Manga No. 1)
  (1974, Weekly Shonen Jump)
  (April 8-April 15, 1973, Weekly Shonen Magazine)
  (1975, Weekly Shonen Sunday)
  (1976, Weekly Shonen Jump)
  (December 1978, 5th Grade)
  (August 1979, Shonen Challenge)
  (January 1996, Big Gold)

Adaptations
These series or one-shots are derivative works, created as adaptations of TV shows or novels by other authors.

  (April to November 1959, Ribon)- Based on TV series by Kazuo Funahashi
  (November 1961-April 1962, Ribon)- Based on the TV series by Aoi Takagaki
  (Weekly Shonen Sunday: #17 for 1973)- Based on the original story by Hisashi Yamanaka
  (Weekly Shonen Magazine: #50 to #52 for 1977)- Based on Eight Family Scenes by Yasutaka Tsutsui
  (1978, Weekly Shonen Magazine)- Based on the original story by Shusaku Endo

Assistants
Kunio Nagatani
Mitsutoshi Furuya
Kenichiro Takai
Takao Yokoyama
Ken'ichi Kitami
Kazuyoshi Torii
Yoshiko Tsuchida
Tsutomu Adachi
Don Sasaki
Shohei Kizaki
Keiji Terashi
Kawaguti Masashi
Koji Oikawa
Kiri Mitsunori
Kondo Yosuke
Shiiya Mitsunori
Yumi Nakano
Yuki Hiroyo

Jinichi Tokisato

See also
Akatsuka Award

References

External links
 – official site 
Fujio Productions 

 
1935 births
2008 deaths
Deaths from pneumonia in Japan
Japanese people from Manchukuo
Manga artists
Osamu Tezuka
Recipients of the Medal with Purple Ribbon